Merry Christmas Mr. Lawrence is the soundtrack from the film of the same name, released on 1 May 1983 in Japan and towards the end of August 1983 in the UK. It was composed by Ryuichi Sakamoto, who also starred in the film. It was Sakamoto's first film score, though it was released several weeks after the film Daijōbu, My Friend, for which he also composed the music. 

Despite receiving mixed reviews from critics, the film has since become a cult classic, largely due to its soundtrack. For the film's soundtrack, Sakamoto won the 1984 BAFTA Award for Best Film Music as well as the 1984 Mainichi Film Award for Best Film Score. David Sylvian contributed lyrics and vocals on "Forbidden Colours", a vocal version of the main theme, "Merry Christmas Mr. Lawrence", both of which were released as singles. A special 30th anniversary edition, which included a second CD of tracks, was released in November 2013 in Japan.

Track listing

Personnel 

 Ryuichi Sakamoto – instrumentation, recording, mixing, producer
 David Sylvian – vocals (track 19)
 Seigen Ono – recording, mixing, producer
 Shinichi Tanaka – recording, mixing, producer
 Michio Nakakoshi – recording assistant, mixing assistant
 Hiroshi Okura – recording supervisor
 Peter Barakan – recording supervisor

Charts

Release history

References 

1983 soundtrack albums
Virgin Records soundtracks